Home Field Advantage is the debut studio album by American hip hop group The High & Mighty. It was released on August 24, 1999 via Rawkus Records and was produced mostly by DJ Mighty Mi, but also featured production from Alchemist and Reef. It features guest appearances from Bobbito García, Cage, Defari, Eminem, Evidence, Kool Keith, Mad Skillz, Mos Def, Pharoahe Monch, Thirstin Howl III, What? What? and Wordsworth. The album peaked at number 193 on the Billboard 200, number 45 on the Top R&B/Hip-Hop Albums, and number 11 on the Heatseekers Albums.

Track listing 

Notes
 B-Boy Document '99 appears on the soundtrack of Tony Hawk's Pro Skater 2.

Personnel
Credits adapted from liner notes.
 Mr. Eon - performer, writer, executive producer
 DJ Mighty Mi - producer, writer, executive producer, mixing
 The Alchemist - producer, mixing
 What? What?  - performer, writer
 Kool Keith - performer, writer
 Bobbito Garcia - performer, writer
 Rob "Reef" Tewlow - additional programming, drum programming
 Lord Sear - beatbox
 Mark Ronson - additional programming
 DJ EV - turntables
 Rashida Jones - additional vocals
 She Speaks - additional vocals
 DJ Sebb - turntables
 Vere Isaacs - bass
 DJ Daze - turntables
 Elliott Thomas - mix engineer
 Kieran Walsh - mix engineer
 Nobody - art direction, graphic design
 A.S.1. - graphic design

Album Chart Positions

Singles Chart Positions

References

External links

1999 debut albums
Rawkus Records albums
Albums produced by the Alchemist (musician)